Harry Elfont (born April 5, 1968) is an American screenwriter and film director.

Born in Philadelphia, Pennsylvania, and raised in nearby Lower Moreland Township, he met his creative partner Deborah Kaplan while they were both enrolled at the Tisch School of the Arts of New York University (NYU). They have since written several films together like: Can't Hardly Wait and Josie and the Pussycats.

Elfont was inducted into Lower Moreland High School's Hall of Fame in 1998.

External links

1968 births
Living people
American male screenwriters
Film directors from Pennsylvania
Screenwriters from Pennsylvania
Tisch School of the Arts alumni
Writers from Philadelphia